Jessi Lintl (born 30 June 1956) is an Austrian politician who is a Member of the National Council for the Freedom Party of Austria (FPÖ).

References

1956 births
Living people
Members of the National Council (Austria)
Freedom Party of Austria politicians
Austrian women in politics